Leopard toad may refer to:
Eastern leopard toad (Amietophrynus pardalis), a toad in the family Bufonidae endemic to South Africa
Western leopard toad (Amietophrynus pantherinus), a toad in the family Bufonidae endemic to the low-lying areas of the Cape Peninsula, the Cape Flats and the Agulhas flats of the Western Cape, South Africa

Animal common name disambiguation pages